Adam Floy Casad (February 9, 1878 – November 14, 1927) was an American football player and an officer in the United States Army. 

A native of Indiana, Casad grew up in Wichita, Kansas where he graduated from high school in 1896. He then attended the United States Military Academy where he played at the halfback and quarterback positions for the Army Black Knights football team from 1899 to 1901. He was captain of Army's 1901 team.  In announcing Casad's unanimous election as captain, The New York Times reported: "The new Captain is a short sturdily built young man.  He stands high in the Class of 1902 and is a general favorite with the whole corps."  In December 1901, Casad was selected by the New York Post as a second-team halfback on its 1901 College Football All-America Team.

Casad graduated from the Military Academy in June 1902.  He was given his diploma by President Theodore Roosevelt, who addressed Casad by his athletic, rather than military, rank: "How do you do, Capt. Casad. I have heard of you before." 

Casad thereafter served for 25 years in the United States Army, attaining the rank of colonel.  He was awarded a Distinguished Service Medal for his service as Deputy Chief Ordnance Officer for the American Expeditionary Forces during World War I.   He was sent to study at the Army Command and General Staff School in August 1927 and died there in November at age 49. He was buried at the San Francisco National Cemetery a week later. Though a lieutenant colonel at the time of his death, he was posthumously advanced to colonel in June 1930 having served temporarily at that rank from January 1918 to June 1920 during World War I.

References

1878 births
1927 deaths
People from Delphi, Indiana
People from Wichita, Kansas
Players of American football from Kansas
American football halfbacks
Army Black Knights football players
Military personnel from Kansas
United States Army personnel of World War I
Recipients of the Distinguished Service Medal (US Army)
Burials at San Francisco National Cemetery
United States Army colonels